Tom Gordon is a former member of the Arizona House of Representatives. He served in the House from January 1999 through January 2001, representing district 3. He did not run for re-election in 2000.

References

20th-century Native Americans
21st-century Native Americans
Hualapai people
Republican Party members of the Arizona House of Representatives
Brigham Young University alumni
Harvard Kennedy School alumni
Living people
Year of birth missing (living people)